Route 886, or Highway 886, may refer to:

Canada
Alberta Highway 886

Israel
 Israel Route 886

United Kingdom
 A886 road

United States